Advance was a screw steamer that was wrecked when she sprang a leak whilst carrying tea-tree saplings between Taree, New South Wales and Coopernook. She was lost on the Manning River, New South Wales on 17 June 1933.

References

Further reading
Online Databases
Australian National Shipwreck Database - Shipwreck Database
Australian Shipping - Arrivals and Departures 1788-1968 including shipwrecks
Encyclopedia of Australian Shipwrecks - New South Wales Shipwrecks

Books
Wrecks on the New South Wales Coast. By Loney, J. K. (Jack Kenneth), 1925–1995 Oceans Enterprises. 1993 .
Australian Shipwrecks - vol1 1622-1850, Charles Bateson, AH and AW Reed, Sydney, 1972, Call number 910.4530994 BAT
Australian shipwrecks Vol. 2 1851–1871 By Loney, J. K. (Jack Kenneth), 1925–1995. Sydney. Reed, 1980 910.4530994 LON
Australian shipwrecks Vol. 3 1871–1900 By Loney, J. K. (Jack Kenneth), 1925–1995. Geelong Vic: List Publishing, 1982 910.4530994 LON
Australian shipwrecks Vol. 4 1901–1986 By Loney, J. K. (Jack Kenneth),  1925–1995. Portarlington Vic. Marine History Publications, 1987 910.4530994 LON
Australian shipwrecks Vol. 5 Update 1986 By Loney, J. K. (Jack Kenneth),  1925–1995. Portarlington Vic. Marine History Publications, 1991 910.4530994 LON

Shipwrecks of the Mid North Coast Region
Maritime incidents in 1933
Interwar period ships of Australia
Merchant ships of Australia
Steamships of Australia